Ellard "Obie" O'Brien (May 27, 1930 – November 27, 2011) was a Canadian professional ice hockey player who played two games in the National Hockey League for the Boston Bruins during the 1955–56 season. The rest of his career, which lasted from 1950 to 1962, was mainly spent in the minor American Hockey League.

Career statistics

Regular season and playoffs

References

External links
 

1930 births
2011 deaths
Boston Bruins players
Boston Olympics players
Canadian ice hockey defencemen
Ice hockey people from Ontario
Hershey Bears players
Philadelphia Ramblers players
Quebec Aces (AHL) players
St. Catharines Teepees players
Sportspeople from St. Catharines
Tulsa Oilers (USHL) players